Motihari is the headquarters of East Champaran district in the Indian state of Bihar. It is located 80 kilometres west of Muzaffarpur and 152 kilometres northwest of the state capital Patna.

Geography

Motihari is located on 26°39' N and 84°55' E in northwestern Bihar.

Topography

The topography of Motihari has been described as scenic, with the "stunning beauty" (in classical terms) of Moti Jheel Lake dividing the town in two halves.

In Gangan Lit-Mag (Gangway Literary Magazine), Austria, wrote Anant Kumar: "The playgrounds of my childhood were the streets of Motihari. Back then that little East Indian town was not overpopulated, and the dry, clean streets of every part of town were ideal for our games: marbles, tops, badminton. And back then Motihari was a wide distance away from the big world. There were very many mango and lichee trees, fragrant lemon bushes, broad, large fields…and very few people. There were scattered decrepit hawelis and bungalows, in which frightening bhuts, geniis and juraels dwelled."

The Gandhi Sangrahalaya has a wide collection of relics and photographs of the Champaran Satyagraha. The Gandhian Memorial Pillar was designed by Nand Lal Bose, a famous artist of Shantiniketan. The foundation stone of the pillar was laid on 10 June 1972 by the then Governor, D. K. Barooch.

Climate
Climate is characterised by high temperatures and evenly distributed precipitation throughout the year. The Köppen Climate Classification sub-type for this climate is "Cfa" (Humid Subtropical). The highest maximum temperature ever recorded in Motihari was 44.4°C on May 24, 1903, while the lowest minimum temperature ever recorded in Motihari was 0.0°C on February 3, 1905. The heaviest rainfall recorded in 24 hours in Motihari was 520.0mm on 25th August 2005.

Demographics

As of 2011 Indian Census, Motihari had a total population of 126,158, of which 67,861 were males and 58,297 were females, with a sex ratio of 859. Population within the age group of 0 to 6 years was 16,870. The total number of literates in Motihari was 92,798, which constituted 73.6% of the population with male literacy of 76.2% and female literacy of 70.5%. The effective literacy rate of 7+ population of Motihari was 84.9%, of which male literacy rate was 88.1% and female literacy rate was 81.2%. The Scheduled Castes and Scheduled Tribes population was 7,373 and 333 respectively. Motihari had 22,224 households in 2011.

 India census, the population of Motihari in 2011 was 101,506, of which male and female were 54,629 and 46,877, respectively. The sex ratio of Motihari city is 858 per 1,000 males. Total literates in Motihari city are 69,576 of which 40,265 were males while 29,311 were females. The crude literacy rate of 68.5% and effective literacy (7+ population) per cent of 80.3%. The children aged 0–6 in Motihari city are 14,910, as per the Census India report, in 2001, with 7,811 males and 7,099 females. The child sex ratio of girls is 909 per 1,000 boys.

Education

The city hosts a number of institutes and universities for higher education supported by both state and central governments.
Motihari College of Engineering.
 Mahatma Gandhi Central University
MS College (Munshi Singh College)

Notable people

George Orwell, author of Animal Farm and Nineteen Eighty-Four, was born in Motihari in 1903. His father, Richard Walmesley Blair, was a deputy posted in the opium department in Bihar. When he was one year old, George left for England with his mother and sister. The town of Motihari was largely unaware of its connection with Orwell. In 2003, Motihari discovered its role in Orwell's life when a number of journalists arrived in the town for Orwell's hundredth birthday. Local officials are making plans for the construction of a museum on Orwell's life. At the beginning of 2021, some miscreants had stolen and vandalized the bust of George Orwell, which was soon recovered and restored at its place by the administration. Towards the end of 2021, the house of George Orwell was repaired and renovated by the administration, and now it wears a fresh look in 2022.  Bihar's art, culture and youth affairs department has made the author's house in Motihari, where he was born on June 25, 1903, a protected site. In 1904, his wife Ida Blair along with her children including an infant Eric Blair, who would later become a famous novelist by the name of George Orwell, moved to England never to return to India. Built on an area of 2.48-acre, Orwell's home was inaugurated as a museum in May 2015.
Khan Bahadur Azizul Huq, one of the two Indian police officers who worked with Edward Henry in the development of fingerprint classification, known as the Henry Classification System, died in Motihari in 1933. "It was Khan Bahadur Azizul Huq who evolved a mathematical formula to supplement Henry's idea of sorting slips in 1024 pigeon holes, based on fingerprint patterns. Rai Bahadur Hem Chandra Bose made further contribution to the fingerprint science by evolving an extended system of sub classification, a telegraphic code for finger impression and a system of single-digit classification."

Both Haque and Bose eventually received honoraria and recognition from the Government of India. At the time of final approval of the honorarium for Haque, the Home Department (Government of India) noted, "It appears from the information now received that he (Haque) was Sir Edward Henry's principal helper in perfecting the scheme and he actually himself devised the method of classification which is in universal use. He thus contributed most materially to a discovery which is of worldwide importance and has brought a great credit to the police of India." Upon retirement from the Police service in Bengal and Bihar, Khan Bahadur Azizul Huq settled in Motihari, and he is buried there.
A.F. Salahuddin Ahmed, National Professor of Bangladesh, a grandson of Khan Bahadur Azizul Huq was born in Motihari in 1924. He was educated at Presidency University, Kolkata, University of Pennsylvania, and University of London, and taught at eminent universities in Bangladesh: Jagannath College, Rajshahi University, Jahangir Nagar University, Dhaka University, and Independent University, Bangladesh, and wrote many books and articles in professional journals and newspapers. In one of his books, Perspectives on History, Society and Politics, he argued that despite the political divisions that took place in South Asia in 1947, the people of this vast region belong to "one indivisible civilisation which is the product of over a thousand years of historical development" and that the destinies of the people inhabiting the subcontinent are closely interlinked. They must therefore learn to live together in peace, as this is essential for their development and progress.
Ramesh Chandra Jha, a modern Hindi poet, author and freedom fighter belonged to Phulwariya village in Motihari.
Thakur Ramapati Singh, a freedom fighter, MLA, Minister, and MP from Motihari.
Anant Kumar (born 1969 in Katihar/Bihar), a German author, translator and literary critic of Indian descent. He spent his childhood in Motihari where his father Rajendra Prasad was Professor of Psychology at Munshi Singh College. He resides in Kassel, Germany. Royal City Gotha (Free state Thueringia, Germany) honored Kumar as a Resident Writer in 2015. Kumar worked 2016 as a fellow in the symposium for dramatic writing at Volturno, Italy. University of Kassel has picked Kumar among prominent alumni on its diamond jubilee celebration 2021.
 Anuranjan Jha, journalist, TV anchor and social worker.
 Ravish Kumar, TV anchor and journalist, NDTV Delhi.
 Abdullah Khan (author) is a novelist, screenwriter and banker. 
 Radha Mohan Singh, Union Minister of Agriculture & Farmers Welfare.
 Sakibul Gani, first cricketer in the world to score a Triple century on his First class debut.
 Sanjeev K Jha, is a film maker and screenwriter, currently based on Mumbai who wrote several popular tv shows and films. Jabariya Jodi, Barot House and Sumi (film) are his notable works. Also, the first writer from Motihari who's written film Sumi (film) got three National Film Awards.

Connection with Gandhi 
Motihari, at that time simply called Champaran, was close to Mahatma Gandhi. He came to Motihari on April 15, 1917 with Raj Kumar Shukla to start the Satyagraha movement in Champaran, known as Champaran Satyagraha, which concerned the exploitations of farmers. Gandhi with his supporters held a big campaign in Champaran. His frequent visits to Champaran and its local areas showed the Gandhi's connection with land. He also understood the cultural and social backwardness of the area, he acted immediately by creating schools and ashrams.

References

External links
 
 Official Website of Tirhut Division

Cities and towns in East Champaran district